Noronhia is a genus of 40 known species of flowering plants in the family Oleaceae, all but one native to Madagascar, the remaining species native to the Comoros Islands north of Madagascar. A few have become naturalized in Mauritius, Réunion, and Bermuda.

The species are deciduous or evergreen trees.

The genus is named in after the Spanish botanist Francisco Noronha.

Species

Madagascar
 Noronhia alleizettei Dubard
 Noronhia ambrensis H.Perrier
 Noronhia boinensis H.Perrier
 Noronhia boivinii Dubard
 Noronhia brevituba H.Perrier
 Noronhia buxifolia H.Perrier
 Noronhia candicans H.Perrier
 Noronhia crassinodis H.Perrier
 Noronhia crassiramosa H.Perrier
 Noronhia cruciata H.Perrier
 Noronhia decaryana H.Perrier
 Noronhia divaricata Scott-Elliot
 Noronhia ecoronulata H.Perrier
 Noronhia emarginata (Lam.) Thouars
 Noronhia gracilipes H.Perrier
 Noronhia grandifolia H.Perrier
 Noronhia humbertiana H.Perrier
 Noronhia introversa H.Perrier
 Noronhia lanceolata H.Perrier
 Noronhia leandriana H.Perrier
 Noronhia linearifolia Boivin ex Dubard
 Noronhia linocerioides H.Perrier
 Noronhia longipedicellata H.Perrier
 Noronhia louvelii H.Perrier
 Noronhia luteola H.Perrier
 Noronhia mangorensis H.Perrier
 Noronhia myrtoides H.Perrier
 Noronhia oblanceolata H.Perrier
 Noronhia ovalifolia H.Perrier
 Noronhia peracuminata H.Perrier
 Noronhia pervilleana (Knobl.) H.Perrier
 Noronhia populifolia H.Perrier
 Noronhia sambiranensis H.Perrier
 Noronhia seyrigii H.Perrier
 Noronhia tetrandra H.Perrier
 Noronhia tubulosa H.Perrier
 Noronhia verrucosa H.Perrier
 Noronhia verticillata H.Perrier
 Noronhia verticilliflora H.Perrier

Comoros
Noronhia cochleata Labat

References

 
Flora of Madagascar
Flora of the Comoros
Oleaceae genera